Negril River may refer to:
 South Negril River, Westmoreland, Jamaica
 North Negril River, Westmoreland, Jamaica